Al-Shifāʾ bint ʿAbd Allāh, whose given name was Laylā, was a companion of the Islamic prophet Muhammad.

Biography
She was the daughter of Abdullah ibn Abdshams and Fatima bint Wahb and a member of the Adi clan of the Quraysh in Mecca. She married Abu Hathma ibn Hudhayfa, and they had two sons, Sulayman and Masruq.

She had a reputation as a wise woman. Her by-name Al-Shifaa means "the Healer" and indicates that she practiced folk-medicine. At a time when barely twenty people in Mecca could read-write, Al-Shifaa was the first woman to acquire this skill. She taught calligraphy to many others, <ref>Kazan, H., Dünden bugüne hanım hattatlar, [Women Calligraphers: Past and Present], İstanbul Büyükşehir Belediyesi, 2010, Chapter 5</ref> including, her relative, Hafsa bint Umar, and the two women remained friends.

Al-Shifaa became a Muslim in Mecca and was among the first to join the emigration to Medina.Bukhari, Al-Adab Al-Mufrad 42:1023. There she had a house between the mosque and the market. Muhammad used to visit her there and he sometimes consulted her about best practice in business matters.

It was narrated that when Umar became caliph, he sometimes would consult with her regarding some matters of the marketplace. But this narration is not proven by authentic source.  She recalled of him: "When Umar talked, he was loud; when he walked, he was fast; when he beat, he hurt." He also used to visit her in her home. On one occasion he asked why her son Sulayman had been missing from morning prayers; she replied that Sulayman had been praying all night and had given way to sleep in the morning.

Legacy
Among the hadith that she narrated are the origin of Umar's title, Amir al-Muminin, and these words of Muhammad: "'The example of the jihad warrior in the path of Allah is like the one who fasts and prays and does not stop fasting or praying until the jihad warrior returns."

Her son Masruq became an emir. By her son Sulayman she had two grandsons, Abu Bakr and Uthman, who were also narrators of hadith''.

References

Women companions of the Prophet
Year of death missing
Banu Adi